John Hele (1571–1605) was an English politician who sat in the House of Commons between 1601 and 1605.

Hele was the second son of John Hele who was a money-lender and MP. He was a student of Exeter College, Oxford in 1588 and of Inner Temple in 1590. He was a J.P for Devon from 1592. In 1601, he was elected Member of Parliament for Plympton Erle. He was elected MP for Plympton Erle again in 1604 to replace Sir Henry Beaumont and sat until his death the following year. 
 
Hele died at the age of about 34. He was the brother of Warwick Hele.

References

1571 births
1605 deaths
Alumni of Exeter College, Oxford
Members of the Inner Temple
Members of the Parliament of England for Plympton Erle
Place of birth unknown
English MPs 1601
English MPs 1604–1611
John